Pryse Pryse (1815–1855), also known as Pryse Loveden, was a British Liberal politician. He served as MP for Cardigan Boroughs from 1849 until his death in 1855.

Pryse's father, Pryse Pryse (1774–1849) had served as MP for Cardigan Boroughs for over thirty years. He died at an early age of 40 in 1855.

References

1815 births
1855 deaths
UK MPs 1852–1857
Liberal Party (UK) MPs for Welsh constituencies
People educated at Eton College